Rowan County is the name of two counties in the United States:

 Rowan County, Kentucky
 Rowan County, North Carolina